King Edward High School (locally called KEHS) is a semi-private, English-medium high school situated in the Buxton Park suburb of Matatiele, in the Eastern Cape, South Africa. It was founded in the 1902.

History 
The school was established in the borough of Matatiele in 1890 by French Protestant Missionaries and the school's only teacher was a teacher named Miss Leary. It was a relatively poor school upon its foundation for impoverished white children. It was little more than a thatched hut when it was created in the 19th century.

Following the South African War, the school received its first headmaster when an Anglo-South African named Mr. Melville was appointed to be the school's first principal. The school, under Mr. Melville, was named "King Edward Coronation School" to honor King Edward VII. The construction of the present school's buildings began in earnest in 1910 and the original name of "King Edward Coronation School" was changed first to "King Edward Public School" and later "King Edward High School". In 1934 the school attained high school status. The school and the small town of Matatiele were hit very hard by the Great Depression.

The school received much funding from the Apartheid government which helped lift the school from poverty. Subsequently, as with all Model C schools in South Africa, the school was reserved for white children only and it did not start admitting black students until 1994 – when South Africa was desegregated. It was the only school for white students in Matatiele during the Apartheid years.

In 2019, a parent accused the school of racism, with some classes composed exclusively of black children. The school said this was due to the need to teach English to non-English speakers to prepare them for later years when all instruction is in English. The alleged segregation was investigated by the Education Department.
After being suspended due to COVID-19, extramural activities and sports resumed in 2022.

Admission criteria 
Most of its students enter the school through between pre-grade one and grade four. All admissions are handled by the school directly and not the government. Students come mainly from the Alfred Nzo District Municipality. The school regularly obtains a 100% pass rate. The school educates nearly 800 learners, a large portion of whom are boarders.

Academics 
The school offers the following subjects in the high school:

Grade 8–9 

 Home language: English or Afrikaans
 First Additional language/second language: Afrikaans, IsiXhosa, Sesotho
 Creative Arts
 Economic management science
 Social Science (History and Geography)
 Life Orientation
 Mathematics
 Technology
 Natural sciences
 Technology

Grade 10–12 

 Home language: English or Afrikaans
 First Additional language/second language: Afrikaans, IsiXhosa, Sesotho
 Accounting
 Business studies
 Computer Application Technology (CAT)
 Engineering Graphic Design
 Geography
 History
 Life Orientation
 Physical education
 Life Sciences
 Mathematics
 Mathematics Literacy

Sports

Summer sports 

 Swimming
 Soccer
 Cricket
 Tennis

Winter sports 

 Athletics
 Cross country
 Hockey
 Netball
 Rugby

Cultural 

 Public speaking
 Debating
 Drama
 Music

References 

Schools in the Eastern Cape
1890s establishments in South Africa